La Horquetta/Talparo is a parliamentary electoral district in Trinidad and Tobago in the centre of Trinidad. It has been represented since 2020 by Foster Cummings of the People's National Movement.

Constituency profile 
The constituency was created prior to the 2007 Trinidad and Tobago general election, and previously largely fell within the boundaries of the Arima electoral district. It had an electorate of 26,031 as of 2015. It is considered a marginal seat. La Horquetta/Talparo includes Talparo, La Horquetta, and Wallerfield.

Members of Parliament 
This constituency has elected the following members of the House of Representatives of Trinidad and Tobago:

Election results

Elections in the 2020s

Elections in the 2010s

References 

Constituencies of the Parliament of Trinidad and Tobago